Hobart Chatfield Chatfield-Taylor (March 24, 1865 - January 17, 1945) was an American writer, novelist, and biographer.  He was considered a top authority on Molière.

Early life
He was born in Chicago to Henry Hobart Taylor and Adelaide Chatfield Taylor in 1865 as Hobart Taylor, but appended the "Chatfield" to his surname as the stipulation of a large inheritance from his maternal uncle Wayne Chatfield (making his full name Hobart Chatfield Chatfield-Taylor). He graduated from Cornell University in 1886.

Career
He edited a literary journal called America for a few years, and also served as consul to Spain in Chicago.  He published his first novel, With Edge Tools, in 1891.

Personal life

In 1890, he was married to Rose Farwell, daughter of former United States Senator Charles B. Farwell. Her sister, Anna, was the wife of composer Reginald de Koven. His wife's portrait was painted by the Swiss-born American society painter Adolfo Müller-Ury, three quarter-length in 1893 (exhibited at Knoedler's New York Gallery in February 1894), and half-length drawing on a pair of white gloves in 1894 (exhibited at Knoedler's New York Gallery in January 1895); both are unlocated. Together, they were the parents of three sons and one daughter:

 Adelaide Chatfield-Taylor (1891–1982), who married Hendricks Hallett Whitman in 1912. They divorced in 1932, and she married William Davies Sohier Jr. in 1940.
 Wayne Chatfield-Taylor (1893–1967), who served as Under Secretary of Commerce and Assistant Secretary of the Treasury under President Franklin D. Roosevelt.
 Otis Chatfield-Taylor (1899–1948), a writer, playwright, editor, theatrical producer who married Janet Benson in 1931. They divorced in 1934, and he married Marochka Borisovna Anisfeld, a daughter of Boris Anisfeld, in 1936.
 Robert Farwell Chatfield-Taylor (1908–1980), who married Valborg Edison Palmer in 1928.

After the death of his first wife in 1918, he remarried to Estelle (née Barbour) Stillman, the widow of George S. Stillman and daughter of George Harrison Barbour, in 1920.

Chatfield-Taylor died at his home in California on January 17, 1945.

Bibliography

Books published by Chatfield-Taylor include:
 With Edge Tools (1891)
 An American Peeress (1893)
 Two Women and a Fool (1895)
 The Land of the Castanet: Spanish Sketches (1896)
 The Vice of Fools (1897)
 The Idle Born (1900)
 The Crimson Wing (1902)
 Molière: a biography (1906)
 Fame's Pathway (1909)
 Goldoni : a biography (1913) (on Carlo Goldoni)
 Chicago (1917)
 Cities of Many Men (1925)
 Tawny Spain (1927)
 Charmed Circles (1935)

References

External links
 
 
 
 

1865 births
1945 deaths
19th-century American novelists
American male biographers
Cornell University alumni
20th-century American novelists
20th-century American biographers
American male novelists
19th-century American male writers
20th-century American male writers
Members of the American Academy of Arts and Letters